Huanglong River, historically known as Zengzigang River, is a right-bank tributary of Xiang River in Wangcheng District and the northernmost one of right-bank tributaries in Changsha section of Xiang River in Hunan, China. Huanglong River rises in Shiziling of Chating Town, flows through Shiziling, Yangjiaping, Dongcheng and Dalong four villages of Chating Town and Huashi Village of Tongguan Subdistrict, merging into Xiang River at Zengzigang Mouth located between Dalong and Huashi villages.

References

Wangcheng District
Rivers of Changsha